= Protectorate of Morocco =

Protectorate of Morocco may refer to:

- French protectorate in Morocco (1912–1956)
- Spanish protectorate in Morocco (1912–1956)
